The 2017 Finnish Figure Skating Championships took place between December 15 and 18, 2016 at the Hakametsä I in Tampere. Skaters competed in the disciplines of men's singles, ladies' singles, pair skating, and ice dancing on the senior and junior levels.

Senior results

Men

Ladies

Pairs

Ice dance

Junior medalists

Men

Ladies

Ice dance

External links
 2017 Finnish Championships results

Finnish Figure Skating Championships
Finnish Figure Skating Championships, 2017
2016 in figure skating
2016 in Finnish sport
Finnish Figure Skating Championships, 2017